Ultrafiltered milk, also known as UF milk, UF skim, or diafiltered milk, is a subclassification of milk protein concentrate that is produced by passing milk under pressure through a thin, porous membrane to separate the components of milk according to size. Specifically, ultrafiltration allows the smaller lactose, water, mineral, and vitamin molecules to pass through the membrane, while the larger protein and fat molecules (key components for making cheese) are retained and concentrated. (Depending on the intended use of the UF milk product, the fat in whole milk may be removed before filtration.) The removal of water and lactose reduces the volume of milk, and thereby lowers its transportation and storage costs.

Ultrafiltration makes cheese manufacturing more efficient. Ultrafiltered milk is also sold directly to consumers under brands like Fairlife and Simply Smart (discontinued producing and selling it May, 2022), who tout its higher protein content, lower sugar content, and creamier taste.

References 

Milk
Membrane technology